Russograptis callopista is a species of moth of the family Tortricidae. It is found in the Democratic Republic of Congo (Equateur) and Nigeria.

The larvae feed from Stictococcus sjoestedti.

References

Moths described in 1913
Tortricini
Moths of Africa